Liga ASOBAL 1994–95 season was the fifth since its establishment. This season start a new competition format. The league was played in two–phases. In the first phase, 16 teams played in a round-robin format. The team with most points earned was the champion. In a second phase, teams from 12th to 15th position had to play the permanence–relegation promotion.

First phase

Overall standing

Second phase

permanence promotion

Juventud Alcalá remained in Liga ASOBAL. Prosesa Ademar León played In–Out promotion.

relegation promotion

Conquense played In–Out playoff. Puleva Maristas relegated.

In–Out playoff

Cangas Frigorificos del Morrazo promoted to Liga ASOBAL. Prosesa Ademar León relegated.
Due to CB Alzira liquidation, Prosesa Ademar León retained its seat in Liga ASOBAL.

Conquense remained in Liga ASOBAL.

Top goal scorers

1994-95
handball
handball
Spain